Lichenotubeufia is a genus of lichenicolous fungi in the family Tubeufiaceae. The genus was circumscribed by Spanish mycologist and lichenologist Javier Etayo in 2017, with Lichenotubeufia eriodermatis assigned as the type species.

Species
Lichenotubeufia boomiana 
Lichenotubeufia cryptica 
Lichenotubeufia eriodermatis 
Lichenotubeufia etayoi 
Lichenotubeufia heterodermiae 
Lichenotubeufia pannariae 
Lichenotubeufia tafallae 
Lichenotubeufia tibellii

References

Tubeufiaceae
Dothideomycetes genera
Taxa described in 2017
Lichenicolous fungi